Specs may refer to:

 Colloquial abbreviation for specifications
 Colloquial abbreviation for spectacles

People
 Specs Clark (1889-1943), American pre-Negro league baseball player
 Specs Ellis, American former Negro league pitcher
 Specs Powell (1922-2007), American jazz drummer and percussionist
 Specs Howard or Jerry Liebman (born 1926), American radio pioneer
 Specs Roberts (1908-?), American former Negro league pitcher
 Specs Toporcer (1899-1989), American Major League Baseball player and executive
 Specs Wright (1927-1963), American jazz drummer

Other uses
 The Specs, a 1980s American band
 Spec's Music, a defunct South Florida-based retail music and video rental chain
 SPECS Sport, a sports company from Indonesia
 Spec's Wine, Spirits & Finer Foods, a Texas-based liquor store chain
 Specs, speculative technology described in the novel Halting State

See also
 SPECS (disambiguation)
 Spex (disambiguation)
 Spec (disambiguation)

Lists of people by nickname